is a female Japanese manga artist, character designer, and illustrator. She currently resides in Tokyo, Japan.

Hiro Suzuhira and Aoi Nishimata have known each other from high school; their first work, Ritual, was introduced in 1996.  In 2000, she joined BasiL and became the illustrator for Bless: Close Your Eyes, Open Your Mind.  After Bless was released, she quit from BasiL and became a freelance illustrator. During this period in 2001, she illustrated one of the characters for Welcome to Pia Carrot 3.  In 2003, she joined Navel along with Aoi Nishimata, illustrating Shuffle! before moving on to Soul Link and Tick! Tack!.

On February 23, 2007, she quit Navel due to health issues and again became a free illustrator.

Works

Character Design

Visual Novels

Other Games
Melody of Emotion
Phantom Breaker

Published Books
 (1996)
Chronicle (2008)
 (2013)

Light Novel Illustration
Ginban Kaleidoscope
Akikan!

Others
11eyes: Tsumi to Batsu to Aganai no Shōjo (Waitress costume design)

Notes and references

External links
Official blog 
Official Twitter account
Hiro Suzuhira at The Visual Novel Database 

1978 births
Living people
Manga artists
Women manga artists
Anime character designers
Japanese female comics artists